Football at the 2015 African Games was played in Brazzaville, the Republic of the Congo between 6–18 September 2015.

Medal summary

Results

Medal table

Men's tournament

Women's tournament

References

External links
Official Website of the African Games, Brazzaville 2015
African Games Men Congo 2015, CAFonline.com
African Games Women Congo 2015, CAFonline.com

 
2015
2015 African Games
African Games
2015 African Games